West Point Light was a lighthouse at the United States Military Academy in West Point, New York. It was located at Gee's Point and was sometimes referred to as Gee's Point Light.

West Point Light would be shown on the NOAA Chart 12343 if it were still active.  Today, Light 39 (USCG 1-38005), on a skeleton tower with a fixed green light characteristic, has replaced West Point Light on Gee's Point.

History
The northeastern extremity of West Point descends to a rocky point, upon the extremity of which was West Point lighthouse.

West Point is a high, bluff thickly wooded point, almost entirely occupied by the grounds and buildings of the United States Military Academy. On the northeast it descends to a bare rocky point, upon the extremity of which stood a low square wooden tower, painted white. This was West Point Lighthouse.

Cultural
The Archives Center at the Smithsonian National Museum of American History has a collection (#1055) of souvenir postcards of lighthouses and has digitized 272 of these and made them available online. These include postcards of West Point Light (New York)  with links to customized nautical charts provided by the National Oceanographic and Atmospheric Administration.

References

External links
 Lighthouse Friends site
 
 
 

Lighthouses completed in 1853
Lighthouses in New York (state)
Hudson River
Transportation buildings and structures in Orange County, New York